Zakharovo is a rural locality (a village) in Posyolok Zolotkovo, Gus-Khrustalny District, Vladimir Oblast, Russia. The population was 25 as of 2010.

Geography 
Zakharovo is located on the Charmus River, 60 km southeast of Gus-Khrustalny (the district's administrative centre) by road. Obdikhovo is the nearest rural locality.

References 

Rural localities in Gus-Khrustalny District